Robert Cary may refer to:

 Robert Cary (died c. 1431), of Cockington, Devon, MP for Devon
 Robert Cary (priest) (1615?–1688)
 Sir Robert Cary, 1st Baronet (1898–1979), British Conservative politician, MP 1935–1945, 1951–1974
 Robert H. Cary (1885–1912), American football player and coach at the University of Montana
 Robert Webster Cary (1890–1967), United States Navy officer and Medal of Honor recipient

See also
 Robert Carey (disambiguation)
Robert Cary-Williams, British fashion designer
Cary (surname)